Amah may refer to:

Amah, a unit of measurement described in the Bible; see Biblical and Talmudic units of measurement
Amah (mother), a term for "mother" in several contexts
Amah (occupation), East Asian or South Asian term for a girl or woman employed as a domestic servant
Amah, an informal and poetic title for the Taoist goddess, the Queen Mother of the West, during the T'ang dynasty in China
Amah Rock, a rock on a hilltop in Sha Tin, Hong Kong